Mieczysław Józef Batsch a.k.a. Bacz (1 January 1900 in Lemberg – 9 September 1977 in Przemyśl) was a Polish soccer forward. He represented both Pogoń Lwów and the Polish National Team.

Batsch was a graduate of the mechanical engineering program of Lwów's Technical University (Politechnika Lwowska).

In the 1920s, while he was on the team, Pogoń won multiple national champions (1922, 1923, 1925, 1926). Together with Wacław Kuchar and Józef Garbień, he scored several goals. His career lasted from 1916 to 1929, after which he occasionally played on the team Oldboye Lwów, which consisted of soccer veterans from Lwów.

On the national team he played in 11 games, scoring 1 goal. Batsch was a member of the side that participated in the 1924 Summer Olympics in Paris.

References

1900 births
1977 deaths
Polish footballers
Poland international footballers
Olympic footballers of Poland
Footballers at the 1924 Summer Olympics
Pogoń Lwów players
Sportspeople from Lviv
People from the Kingdom of Galicia and Lodomeria
Polish Austro-Hungarians
Lviv Polytechnic alumni
Association football forwards